Anbe Aaruyire may refer to:
 Anbe Aaruyire (1975 film), 1975 Tamil film
 Anbe Aaruyire (2005 film), 2005 Tamil film